UFC 132: Cruz vs. Faber was a mixed martial arts event held by the Ultimate Fighting Championship on July 2, 2011 at the MGM Grand Garden Arena in Las Vegas, Nevada.

Background
UFC 132 was originally set to feature a rematch between B.J. Penn and Jon Fitch, but both were forced to withdraw because of injuries.

Evan Dunham was expected to face George Sotiropoulos at the event, but was forced off the card with an injury and replaced by Rafael dos Anjos.

Jason Miller was scheduled to face Aaron Simpson at this event. However, Miller was removed from the card after accepting a coaching position on The Ultimate Fighter 14, and replaced by Brad Tavares.

Cub Swanson was expected to face Erik Koch at this event, but was forced from the bout with an injury. Koch was instead moved to UFC Fight Night 25 to take on Jonathan Brookins.

UFC 132 featured two preliminary fights live on Spike TV and the remainder of the preliminary bouts streamed on Facebook.

Results

Bonus awards
Fighters were awarded $75,000 bonuses.

 Fight of the Night: Dominick Cruz vs. Urijah Faber
 Knockout of the Night: Carlos Condit
 Submission of the Night: Tito Ortiz

Reported payout
The following is the reported payout to the fighters as reported to the Nevada State Athletic Commission. It does not include sponsor money or "locker room" bonuses often given by the UFC and also do not include the UFC's traditional "fight night" bonuses.

Dominick Cruz: $40,000 ($20,000 win bonus) def. Urijah Faber: $32,000
Chris Leben: $92,000 ($46,000 win bonus) def. Wanderlei Silva: $200,000
Dennis Siver: $50,000 ($25,000 win bonus) def. Matt Wiman: $18,000
Tito Ortiz: $450,000 (no win bonus) def. Ryan Bader: $20,000
Carlos Condit: $68,000 ($34,000 win bonus) def. Dong Hyun Kim: $41,000
Melvin Guillard: $64,000 ($32,000 win bonus) def. Shane Roller: $21,000
Rafael dos Anjos: $28,000 ($14,000 win bonus) def. George Sotiropoulos: $15,000
Brian Bowles: $34,000 ($17,000 win bonus) def. Takeya Mizugaki: $12,000
Aaron Simpson: $34,000 ($17,000 win bonus) def. Brad Tavares: $10,000
Anthony Njokuani: $16,000 ($8,000 win bonus) def. Andre Winner: $14,000
Jeff Hougland: $12,000 ($6,000 win bonus) def. Donny Walker: $6,000

References

External links
Official UFC 132 Fight Card

Ultimate Fighting Championship events
2011 in mixed martial arts
Mixed martial arts in Las Vegas
2011 in sports in Nevada
MGM Grand Garden Arena